James Coleridge (3 December 1759 – 1836) was the older brother of the philosopher-poet Samuel Taylor Coleridge and father of Sir John Taylor Coleridge, future Judge of the King's Bench, and Henry Nelson Coleridge, the editor of Samuel Taylor Coleridge's works.

History
He obtained his captaincy during the period of the French Revolutionary Wars and was later promoted to Colonel.  He purchased the Coleridge family home, the Chanter's House, in Ottery St. Mary, Devon in 1796. During the Napoleonic Wars he escorted French prisoners to Dartmoor prison.

References

Royal Navy personnel of the French Revolutionary Wars
1759 births
1836 deaths
18th-century English people
19th-century English people
James
People from Ottery St Mary